XHMYL-FM 92.1/XEMYL-AM 1000 is a combo radio station in Mérida, Yucatán. It is known as MYL FM 92.1 and broadcasts a pop format.

History
The concession for 1000 AM was awarded in 1984 to Radio Mil del Sur, S.A. de C.V. The FM station was added in 1994.

Until May 31, 2015, the station carried the Los 40 Principales national format from Televisa Radio. Between 2015 and November 2020, the station broadcast an alternative music format known as So Good.

On November 16, 2020, So Good and Grupo Rivas parted way, and Rivas relaunched the station as "MYL FM".

References

Radio stations in Yucatán
Radio stations established in 1984